Norman Dumenil John Straton (4 November 1840 – 5 April 1918) was an Anglican bishop.

Stratton was educated at Trinity College, Cambridge, graduating BA in 1863, and ordained in 1865. His first post was as a curate at Market Drayton from where he became vicar of Kirkby Wharfe then from 1875 vicar and  rural dean of Wakefield. From 1888 to 1892 he was Archdeacon of Huddersfield. In 1892 he became the Bishop of Sodor and Man and 15 years later was translated to Newcastle where he was nominated on 8 July, installed on 2 September 1907.  In an age when bishops lived as lords, it is noteworthy that the 1901 Census records Straton resident in the Isle of Man with 6 servants and the 1911 Census in Benwell Tower, Newcastle upon Tyne, with 9 servants.  In 1914, Straton was absent from his post through ill-health for some time and, on his return to duty, showed that he was a strong supporter of British involvement in the Great War, certain that 'the righteous LORD, WHO loveth righteousness will prove Himself to have been on our side'.  He took responsibility for providing a Church Hut for 5000 troops based in Alnwick, and for encouraging recruitment to the forces from clergy and their families. He announced his retirement in July 1915 and died in 1918.

References

External links

Photo of Straton

1840 births
Alumni of Trinity College, Cambridge
Archdeacons of Huddersfield
19th-century Church of England bishops
20th-century Church of England bishops
Bishops of Sodor and Man
Bishops of Newcastle
1918 deaths
Deans of Peel